The Aloha Bowl was a college football bowl game played in Honolulu, Hawaii, at Aloha Stadium. Certified by the National Collegiate Athletic Association (NCAA), the game featured teams from Division I-A (later known as the Football Bowl Subdivision).

History
The Aloha Bowl was established in 1982 by Mackay Yanagisawa, a sportsman from Oahu. With the exception of the 1983–1986 playings, the Aloha Bowl was traditionally played on Christmas morning in Honolulu. For most of its playings, the game was sponsored by Jeep Corporation.  The bowl originally applied for certification by the NCAA Division I Championship Committee in 1981, but certification was delayed until 1982. The inaugural game was played in 1982 and the last game was played in 2000, after it lost its sponsorship as a result of a corporate merger between Jeep and DaimlerChrysler.  In 1998 and 1999, the Aloha Bowl was part of a doubleheader followed by the Oahu Bowl; the 1998 event was the first televised doubleheader in American college football history.

After Jeep dropped its sponsorship, the bowl committees of the Hawaiian bowl games elected to move the games to the U.S. mainland. The Oahu Bowl moved to Seattle and was played as the Seattle Bowl for two years. The Aloha Bowl was to move to San Francisco, but before the move could be completed the game lost its bowl certification. San Francisco later received a bowl game, first played in December 2002 as the San Francisco Bowl, which later operated under several other names. Hawaii did not remain without a bowl for long, however, as a new bowl committee received certification in 2002 for a Christmastime game, the Hawaii Bowl, at Aloha Stadium.

The Aloha Bowl was preceded years earlier by the Poi Bowl (late 1930s) and Pineapple Bowl (1940s and early 1950s).

Game results

Appearances by team

Appearances by conference 

*Note: Table based on conference affiliation at the time the game was played and may not represent current conference alignment.

Television

Most editions of the Aloha Bowl were televised by ABC (1986–2000).

In popular  culture
 In the "Twas the Nut Before Christmas" episode of King of the Hill, first aired on December 17, 2000, Hank Hill exclaims "Tomorrow, Christmas service falls right between the Aloha Bowl and the Oahu Bowl."

See also
 List of college bowl games

References

 
American football in Hawaii
College sports in Hawaii
Defunct college football bowls
Recurring sporting events established in 1982
1982 establishments in Hawaii
2000 disestablishments in Hawaii
Recurring sporting events disestablished in 2000